New York is a 1927 American drama silent film directed by Luther Reed and written by Barbara Chambers, Becky Gardiner and Forrest Halsey. The film stars Ricardo Cortez, Lois Wilson, Estelle Taylor, William Powell, Norman Trevor and Richard "Skeets" Gallagher. The film was released on January 30, 1927, by Paramount Pictures. It is considered a lost film.

Plot
Bowery musician (Ricardo Cortez) becomes engaged to society heiress (Lois Wilson) and is visited by old sweetheart (Estelle Taylor) whose jealous husband (William Powell) kills her. Musician is tried and found guilty of murder but eventually the truth comes out and he marries the heiress.

Cast 
Ricardo Cortez as Michael Angelo Cassidy
Lois Wilson as Marjorie Church
Estelle Taylor as Angie Miller
William Powell as Trent Regan
Norman Trevor as Randolph Church
Richard "Skeets" Gallagher as Buck
Margaret Quimby as Helen Matthews
Lester Sharpe as Izzy Blumenstein 
Charles Byer as Jimmie Wharton

Preservation status
The film is now lost.

References

External links 
 

1927 films
1920s English-language films
Silent American drama films
1927 drama films
Paramount Pictures films
American black-and-white films
Lost American films
American silent feature films
1927 lost films
Lost drama films
Films directed by Luther Reed
1920s American films